Nagwa Fouad (born ) is a retired Egyptian female volleyball player, who played as a middle blocker.

She was part of the Egypt women's national volleyball team at the 2002 FIVB Volleyball Women's World Championship in Germany. On club level she played with Sporting, Alexandria.

Clubs
 Sporting, Alexandria (2002)

References

1983 births
Living people
Egyptian women's volleyball players
Place of birth missing (living people)